Washington Township is an inactive township in Stone County, in the U.S. state of Missouri.

Washington Township was erected in 1851, taking its name from President George Washington.

References

Townships in Missouri
Townships in Stone County, Missouri